() is a Belgian city and municipality in the Flemish province of West Flanders. The municipality comprises the city of  proper and the former communes of Beerst, Esen, Kaaskerke, Keiem, Lampernisse, Leke, Nieuwkapelle, Oostkerke, Oudekapelle, Pervijze, Sint-Jacobs-Kapelle, Stuivekenskerke, Vladslo and Woumen.

Most of the area west of the city is a polder riddled with drainage trenches.

History

Medieval origins
The 9th-century Frankish settlement of Dicasmutha was situated at the mouth of a stream near the River Yser. By the 10th century, a chapel and marketplace were already established. The city's charter was granted two centuries later and defensive walls built in 1270. The economy was already then based mainly on agriculture, with dairy products and linen driving the economy.

From the 15th century to the French Revolution, Diksmuide was affected by the wars between the Netherlands, France, Spain, and Austria, with a corresponding decline in activity; it was captured by Allied forces in the Capitulation of Diksmuide in 1695.  The 19th century was more peaceful and prosperous.

World War I
The Battle of the Yser started in October 1914. Thanks to the water the Belgians were able to stop the Germans; at the end of October, they opened the floodgates holding back the River Yser and flooded the area. As a result, the river became a front line throughout the First World War. The city was first attacked on 16 October 1914 and defended by Belgian and French troops, which marked the beginning of the battle. Colonel Alphonse Jacques led the troops that prevented  from being taken by the German Army. Despite the heavy Belgian losses, the press, politicians, literary figures and the military itself created propaganda which formed public opinion into making the action appear strategic and heroic.

By the time the fighting ended, the town had been reduced to rubble. It was, however, completely rebuilt in the 1920s.

Sights

The belfry contains a 30-bell carillon and is a UNESCO World Heritage Site, on the list Belfries of Belgium and France.
The City Hall and neighbouring Saint Nicolas Church were completely rebuilt after World War I in the Gothic style of the 14th and 15th centuries.
A peace monument, the Yser Tower, was built after the First World War in the 1920s. It was demolished in 1946 because during the Second World War it had been the scene of Nazi ceremonies and collaboration. A new tower was built in the 1950s. The tower houses a World War I museum owned by the United Nations, where it is possible among other things to experience the odour of mustard gas. The Yser Tower is also the scene of the yearly , a celebration of peace and of Flemish political autonomy. During World War II, it was used for Nazi-inspired meetings. After the war it still had problems with neo-Nazis from all over Europe. They were a minority, but the press emphasised this minority participation. However, after many years the organisers succeeded in banning neo-Nazis.
Diksmuide used to have its own weekly magazine called Weekblad van Dixmude.

Notable inhabitants

 :nl:Pierre Morel-Danheel (1773-1856), politician
 Maria Doolaeghe (1803–1884), writer
 Wim Vansevenant, record three-time Tour de France Lanterne rouge winner

Twin cities

 Ellesmere, United Kingdom
 Ploemeur, France
 Rottach-Egern, Germany
 Finnentrop, Germany

References

External links

  

 
Sub-municipalities of Diksmuide
Municipalities of West Flanders
World Heritage Sites in Belgium